The Fake Emir is a 1924 German silent adventure film directed by and starring Harry Piel. It also features Hermann Leffler and Claire Rommer. It was followed by A Dangerous Game.

The film's sets were designed by the art director Kurt Richter.

Cast
In alphabetical order
 Friedrich Berger
 Ruth Beyer as Nelly
 Maria Forescu
 Fred Immler as Hakim
 Hermann Leffler
 Paul Meffert
 Harry Piel as Actor / Emir
 Claire Rommer as Princess Pasantasena
 Ruth Weyher

References

Bibliography
 Grange, William. Cultural Chronicle of the Weimar Republic. Scarecrow Press, 2008.

External links

1924 films
Films of the Weimar Republic
Films directed by Harry Piel
German silent feature films
German black-and-white films
German adventure films
1924 adventure films
Silent adventure films
1920s German films